USS Superior is a name given to two ships of the United States Navy:

 , a frigate built in 1814 at Sackett's Harbor, New York.
 , a minesweeper, commissioned 1944, decommissioned 1947.

United States Navy ship names